Utiaritichthys is a genus of serrasalmid fish found in the Amazon and Orinoco basins in tropical South America. The adults are typically found in rapidly flowing water where they feed on aquatic plants in the family Podostemaceae and filamentous algae.

The monophyly and taxonomic position of the genus is not fully resolved. The only clear difference from Myloplus is the comparatively longer body of Utiaritichthys.

Species
There are currently 3 recognized species in this genus:
 Utiaritichthys esguiceroi Pereira & R. M. C. Castro, 2014
 Utiaritichthys longidorsalis Jégu, Tito de Morais & dos Santos, 1992
 Utiaritichthys sennaebragai A. Miranda-Ribeiro, 1937

References

Serrasalmidae
Characiformes genera
Freshwater fish of Brazil
Fish of French Guiana
Fish of the Amazon basin
Taxa named by Alípio de Miranda-Ribeiro